The New Beginning in Sapporo was a professional wrestling event promoted by New Japan Pro-Wrestling (NJPW). The event took place on February 4 and 5, 2023 in Sapporo, Hokkaido at the Hokkaido Prefectural Sports Center. The first night of the event featured eight matches, one of which was contested for a championship, while the second night featured three championship matches out of also eight matches overall. This was the thirty-fifth event under the New Beginning name and the fifth to take place in Sapporo, with the last back in 2020.

Production

Background
NJPW held the inaugural The New Beginning event on February 15, 2011, with future events going on to take place annually in January and/or February. In 2022, New Beginning events were absent, aside from The New Beginning USA.

Storylines
The New Beginning in Osaka featured professional wrestling matches that involved different wrestlers from pre-existing scripted feuds and storylines. Wrestlers portrayed villains, heroes, or less distinguishable characters in scripted events that built tension and culminated in a wrestling match or series of matches.

Event

Night 1
Night 1 started with a match between Great-O-Khan taking on Oskar Leube. O-Khan won after applying the Sheep Killer.

Next, House of Torture faces Ren Narita, Ryohei Oiwa, El Desperado and Minoru Suzuki. In the end, Narita connected with a Kanuki suplex and applied the Cobra Twist for the submission win.

Next, TMDK took on Chaos and Yuto Nakashima. TMDK won after Kosei Fujita applied a double wristlock on Nakashima for the submission win.

Next, The Guerrillas of Destiny, Master Wato and Hiroshi Tanahashi faced Bullet Club. In the end, Wato performed a Mistica into a jackknife pin for the win.

Next on the card, Los Ingobernables de Japon faced Chaos and Ryusuke Taguchi. LIJ won after Shingo Takagi hit The Last of the Dragonon Taguchi.

Next, Catch 2/2 (with Great-O-Khan) defended the IWGP Junior Heavyweight Tag Team Championship against Just4Guys (with Taka Michinoku). Catch 2/2 won after TJP performed a plancha on the outside to Yoshinobu Kanemaru and Francesco Akira delivered a Speedball and Nova Fireball for the win.

In the penultimate match, Will Ospreay (with Great-O-Khan) took on Taichi. In the closing stages, Ospreay performed a rolling elbow, the Hidden Blade and the StormBreaker for the win.

Main Event
In the main event, Tetsuya Naito faced Shota Umino. Umino performed a tornado DDT and a missle dropkick. Naito then took Umino to the corner for the Combinacion Cabron. Naito then hit a swinging DDT and the Pluma Blanca. As Naito was looking for Destino, Umino countered into a piledriver. Umino then delivered another piledriver, but Naito kicked out. Naito then hit a reverse DDT for a two-count. As Naito was looking for Destino again, Umino again countered into a package tombstone slam. Umino was then looking for another Death Rider, but Naito escaped and delivered two Destinos for the win.

Night 2
Night 2 started with United Empire facing Just4Guys. In the end, Ospreay hit the Hidden Blade on Michinoku for the win.

Next, Yuto Nakashima, Minoru Suzuki, El Desperado and Ren Narita faced House of Torture. The former won after Narita connected with the Cobra Twist on Yujiro Takahashi for the submission victory. After the match, Suzuki, Desperado and Narita challenged House of Torture to a championship match at Osaka.

Next, Kenta  and Taiji Ishimori faced Master Wato and Hiroshi Tanahashi. In the end, after Cipher UTAKI was blocked, Ishimori rolled up Wato for the win.

Next, Guerrillas of Destiny took on Bullet Club. As Gedo was trying to use brass knuckles, Tama Tonga intercepted into a Gun Stun, before Jado delivered a crossface for the submission victory.

Next, Los Ingobernables de Japon faced Shota Umino, Ryusuke Taguchi, Kazuchika Okada and Toru Yano. In the end, as Sanada was looking for a moonsault, Okada escaped and delivered a two Rainmakers for the win.

The next bout saw Bishamon defend the IWGP World Tag Team Championship agianst TMDK. In the end, Mikey Nichols delivered a Blue Thunder Bomb to Hirooki Goto, but Yoshi-Hashi broke it up. Bishamon then delivered an elevated GTR for the win.

In the penultimate match, Zack Sabre Jr. faced Tomohiro Ishii for the NJPW World Television Championship. In the latter stages, Ishii delivered a headbutt and a sliding lariat, but Sabre Jr. kicked out. Sabre Jr. then hit the Zack Driver to retain his title.

Main event
Hiromu Takahashi defended the IWGP Junior Heavyweight Championship agianst Yoh in the main event. As Takahashi was looking for the Time Bomb, Yoh blocked it and hit a lariat. As Yoh escaped another Time Bomb attempt, Takahashi delivered a Victory Royal DDT, a reverse hurricarana, a superkick, a dragon suplex and the Time Bomb for a two-count. As Takahashi was looking for another Time Bomb, Yoh escaped and delivered a reverse DDT. As Yoh was looking for Direct Driver, Takahashi delivered a Stunner, but You kicked out. Takahashi then delivered a 5 Star Clutch, but Yon refused to quit. Takahashi then delivered two Hiromu chan Bombers and another Time Bomb to pickup the win and retain the title.

Results

References

External links 
 Official New Japan Pro-Wrestling's website

2023 in professional wrestling